Liptrot is a German surname of uncertain etymology. The surname is recorded in England in the 19th century, where it may derive from a German name.

Origins and variants 
One theory suggests that the surname is derived from the German name, "Liebetraut", which comes from the Old High German , meaning "beloved" or "dear" and trut, meaning "a friend" or "sweetheart". The combination could mean "dearly loved" or "beloved friend". The variants "Liubtrut" and "Liebtrut" are sometimes used in Germany today as women's given names. In the Middle High German dialect, the name became "Lieptrut", "Lieptraut", and occasionally "Lieptrap". A typical pronunciation of the name "Liebetraut" would have been "LEEB-uh-troot" (with a rolled "r") and it is suggested that the German sound was difficult for people in England to pronounce and it evolved into "Liptrot" and its variants. One source suggests that sometime in the mid-16th century an eponymous German protestant named "Liebetraut" immigrated to Lancashire, England to escape religious persecution at the height of the Protestant Reformation in Germany. It has further been suggested that this "Liebetraut" is the one whose name was changed to "Liptrot" and was the ancestor of all people with the name "Liptrot" in England.

People with the surname 
 Christopher Liptrot (b. 1980), cricketer
Amy Liptrot, British journalist and author.

Related surnames 
 Liebetrut

References

German-language surnames